Heliodiaptomus is a genus of copepods in the family Diaptomidae, containing the following species:.

Heliodiaptomus alikunhii Sehgal, 1960
Heliodiaptomus cinctus (Gurney, 1907)
Heliodiaptomus contortus (Gurney, 1907)
Heliodiaptomus elegans Kiefer, 1935
Heliodiaptomus falxus Shen & Tai, 1964
Heliodiaptomus kieferi (Brehm & Chappuis, 1935)
Heliodiaptomus kikuchii Kiefer, 1932
Heliodiaptomus kolleruensis Reddy & Radhakrishna, 1981
Heliodiaptomus lamellatus Sung, Shen, Sung, Li & Chen, 1975
Heliodiaptomus nipponicus (Kokubo, 1914)
Heliodiaptomus phuthaiorum Sanoamuang, 2004
Heliodiaptomus pulcher (Gurney, 1907)
Heliodiaptomus viduus (Gurney, 1916)

References

Diaptomidae
Taxonomy articles created by Polbot
Copepod genera